This is a list of notable people associated with Marshall University in Huntington, West Virginia, United States of America.

Athletics

Baseball

Jeff Montgomery, former three-time All-Star closer, Cincinnati Reds and Kansas City Royals, KC Hall of Fame member, with over 300 saves, Marshall University Athletic Hall of Fame; led Herd to 1981 Southern Conference Championship, last conference title won by program, and tied MU record with four shutouts as freshman pitcher
J. D. Hammer, MLB pitcher currently with the Colorado Rockies organization
Rick Reed, former MLB starting pitcher Cincinnati Reds, Pittsburgh Pirates, New York Mets and Minnesota Twins, MU assistant coach for baseball in 2005; pitched in World Series, 2000 for Mets, winning one games against the New York Yankees, also pitched for Huntington (W.Va.) High School.
Dan Straily, relief pitcher, Oakland Athletics, 2012–14; Chicago Cubs, 2014; Houston Astros, 2015; Cincinnati Reds, 2016; Miami Marlins, 2017; former Marshall pitcher, member of 2008 Conference USA finalists in 2008 for Thundering Herd team that finished 30-30-1, most wins in school history, stood until 2016 team finished 34-21.

Basketball

Dan D'Antoni, head coach Marshall University since 2014; previously professional NBA assistant coach, with Los Angeles Lakers, New York Knicks and Phoenix Suns; member of Marshall University Athletic Hall of Fame; as point guard led Herd to back-to-back NIT appearances in 1967 and 1968, advancing to "Final Four" with wins over Villanova and Nebraska in 1967, losing in 2OT to St. Peter's (102-93); coached Socastee High School at Myrtle Beach, S.C. to over 500 wins, created Beach Ball Classic Tournament with both basketball and scholar competitions.
Mike D'Antoni, current head coach of Houston Rockets, previously head coach Los Angeles Lakers, New York Knicks, Phoenix Suns, Denver Nuggets and in Italian League for many years; former player, NBA Kansas City Royals, and Italian League; 50 Greatest Euroleague Contributors (1998); Marshall University Athletic Hall of Fame for leading Herd to NCAA Tournament in 1972 (23-4, No. 12 in nation in Associated Press poll and No. 18 in UPI poll, reached as high as No. 8 in nation in AP); and to NIT in 1973 (20-7), losing to Fairfield (80-76)
Hal Greer, Naismith Basketball Hall of Fame (inducted 1982), Springfield, Mass.; 50 Greatest Players in NBA History (1996); Philadelphia 76ers and Syracuse Nationals; Marshall University Athletic Hall of Fame; WV Sportswriters Hall of Fame; won NBA Title in 1967, was MVP of All-Star Game in 1968.
 DeAndre Kane, basketball player in the Israeli Premier League and EuroLeague
James Kelly (born 1993), basketball player in the Israel Basketball Premier League
 Ken Labanowski (born 1959), American-Israeli basketball player in the Israel Basketball Premier League
Hassan Whiteside, professional basketball, NBA Sacramento Kings, 2010–11, Miami Heat 2014–19, Portland Trail Blazers since 2019; drafted in second round of 2010 Draft; NBADL Reno Bighorns, 2011–12, and Sioux Falls Skyforce, 2012–13; played just one year at Marshall, but set game (13), season and career (182) blocks records for Marshall, 2009–10, for Coach Donnie Jones, and helped Herd to CIT berth, first post-season for MU since 1988, earning Freshman All-American honors from The Sporting News.
Tyler Wilkerson, professional basketball, Israel, 2011–12; NBADL, Austin Toros. 2012–13; finished with 657 rebounds (16th all-time) and 1,038 points (38th all-time) at Marshall University, and helped Herd to back-to-back CIT berths, the Herd's first post-season action since 1988.

Football

Greg Adkins, NCAA assistant coach-offensive line at Oklahoma State; formerly NFL assistant coach-tight ends, Buffalo Bills, 2013; college assistant-tight ends, Syracuse University; captain and starting tackle for Thundering Herd; started career at Marshall; also coached at University of Georgia.
George Barlow, college football assistant coach at NC State since 2014, Vanderbilt University, 2012–13; previously assistant coach and interim head coach at New Mexico State; played defensive back for Thundering Herd, 1987–90.
Mike Bartrum, Pro Bowl long snapper, Philadelphia Eagles, New England Patriots, Green Bay Packers and Kansas City Chiefs, retired 2007, Marshall University Athletic Hall of Fame; became head coach Meigs (Ohio) High School in 2012 (where he played in high school) and Country Commissioner for Meigs Co.
Alex Bazzie, CFL player for British Columbia Lions 2014-17; signed contract with Indianapolis Colts as Reserve/Future player this spring, possible move to NFL.
Rogers Beckett, former NFL safety,  played for the San Diego Chargers and the Cincinnati Bengals; standout safety for Thundering Herd football
Ahmad Bradshaw, NFL running back, New York Giants, Super Bowl champs for 2007 and 2011, cut in winter of 2013 and free agent, due to salary cap restrictions on Giants, also surgery on ankle this off-season; picked up by the Indianapolis Colts in the offseason of 2013-2015, retired
Omar Brown, NFL safety, 2012-14 Baltimore Ravens, Super Bowl Champion
Troy Brown, former Pro Bowl receiver/punt returner, New England Patriots, three Super Bowl championships and two runners-up, Marshall Hall of Fame and member of Comcast-New England, covering Pats football
Larry Coyer, former NFL assistant coach, Tampa Bay Buccaneers and Denver Broncos, Marshall Hall of Fame
Chris Crocker, NFL safety, Miami Dolphins, Atlanta Falcons, Cleveland Browns and Cincinnati Bengals
Vinny Curry, NFL Defensive End, Philadelphia Eagles, Super Bowl LII Champion and former C-USA Defensive Player of the Year (2011). A Marshall Football Herd Captain Vinny Curry would start the Vinny Curry Project while in the pros. The football locker rooms were named after him in honor of the contributions. 
Frank Gatski, Pro Football Hall of Fame (inducted 1985), Canton, Ohio; Center/linebacker for Cleveland Browns 1946–56, Detroit Lions 1957; won eight championships in 11 title games over 12 seasons in the NFL and AAFC, most ever by any position (non-kicker) player; Marshall Hall of Fame; West Virginia Sportswriters Hall of Fame
Chris Hanson, former NFL punter, New England Patriots, New Orleans Saints and Jacksonville Jaguars
Mario Harvey, NFL linebacker, Indianapolis Colts, 2011–2012
Carl Lee, former Pro Bowl defensive back, Minnesota Vikings and New Orleans Saints, Marshall Hall of Fame, Vikings 50th Anniversary team and former head coach of West Virginia State University Yellow Jacket football
Byron Leftwich, NFL quarterback, Jacksonville Jaguars (drafted first round, selection #7, highest in Marshall history) and Atlanta Falcons, currently with the Pittsburgh Steelers 2008–2012; member of Marshall Hall of Fame; led Herd to Motor City Bowl win in 2000 over University of Cincinnati, to GMAC Bowl win over East Carolina University 64-61 in 2OTs in 2001 and another GMAC Bowl win in 2002 over University of Louisville, 38-15; won Mid-American Conference titles in 2000 and 2002
Doug Legursky, NFL center/guard and fullback, Pittsburgh Steelers, since 2009; team captain for Thundering Herd as three-year starter at center
Chris Massey, former NFL long snapper/fullback, St. Louis Rams, Chicago Bears and Carolina Panthers; as player for Herd, helped Herd to numerous conference titles and bowl wins; misfired on only one snap in college and NFL career
Albert McClellan, NFL linebacker, Baltimore Ravens 2010–12, won Super Bowl championship 2012, New England Patriots and New York Jets; Conference USA Defensive Player of Year in 2007, led Herd to win in 2009 Little Caesars Pizza Bowl over Ohio University, 21-17
Randy Moss, Pro Football Hall of Fame Class of 2018, five-time Pro Bowl receiver; holds the single-season record for receiving touchdowns by a rookie with 17; holds the single-season record for receiving touchdown with 23; second all-time in receiving TD's with 156, trailing only Jerry Rice; Minnesota Vikings (1998 first round, #21 pick), Oakland Raiders, New England Patriots, Tennessee Titans and San Francisco 49ers
Okechukwu Okoroha, football player
Chris Parker, NFL player
Chad Pennington, former NFL quarterback, Miami Dolphins and New York Jets, 2000–2010 (first round, #12 pick); FOX NFL analyst, 2012; Marshall Hall of Fame; led 1995 Herd to I-AA finals as true frosh; then led MU to Mid-American Conference titles in 1997-98-99, Motor City Bowls in 1997-98-99, to No. 25 ranking (The Sporting News) in 1998 with 12-1 mark, then to No. 10 rankings in Associated Press, USA Today and The Sporting News final polls for I-A football with 13-0 mark in 1999, knocking off No. 25 BYU in MCB III
Tony Petersen, college football coach-offensive coordinator, Louisiana Tech, 2013; co-offensive coordinator, qb coach and assoc. head coach, Marshall University, 2010–12; also coached at Marshall, 1991–2000; Marshall Hall of Fame; quarterbacked Herd to I-AA National Finals for first time, falling to University of Louisiana-Monroe, 43-42, in championship game in a school-record 10-win season in 1987, then saved three games (setting MU record) in 1988, winning Southern Conference Athlete of the Year honors
Bob Pruett, former defensive coordinator, University of Virginia and former head coach, Marshall University, 1996–2004, lettered nine times in three sports at Marshall 1961–64 (football, track and wrestling); member of Marshall Hall of Fame
Jason Rader, former NFL tight end, Miami Dolphins, Tennessee Titans and New England Patriots
 Steve Sciullo, former NFL Offensive Lineman, Indianapolis Colts and Philadelphia Eagles
Lee Smith, NFL tight end, Buffalo Bills, 2012; New England Patriots, 2011–12
Mark Snyder, college assistant coach-defensive coordinator, Texas A&M, 2012–13; defensive coordinator, USF Bulls, 2010–12; head coach, Marshall University, 2005–2009; defensive coordinator, Ohio State University, 1999–2005; defensive coordinator, Youngstown State University
C.J. Spillman, NFL safety, San Diego Chargers and San Francisco 49ers, played in Super Bowl XLVII, losing to Baltimore Ravens
Wayne Underwood, NFL player
John Wade, former NFL center, Oakland Raiders, Jacksonville Jaguars and Tampa Bay Buccaneers
Darius Watts, former wide receiver, Philadelphia Soul, Arena Football League, 2008; New York Giants and Denver Broncos, NFL

Olympians
Chantelle Handy, basketball player for the Great Britain women's national basketball team in the 2012 Summer Olympics
Lea Ann Parsley, Olympic silver medalist (Skeleton), 2002 Salt Lake City Games, Marshall Hall of Fame (track & field and basketball); lettered four times in basketball and track each as student athlete

Other
Tammie Green, LPGA golfer
Luke Gross, all-time scoring leader caps leader for the US national rugby union team; Gross played basketball at Marshall, 1991–93
Dustin Hazelett, professional mixed martial artist, formerly with the UFC

Business

Entertainment

Wilmer Calderon, actor
Billy Crystal, actor, comedian, was awarded and accepted a baseball scholarship at Marshall University, but did not graduate
Brad Dourif, Academy Award-nominated actor, voice of Chucky in the Child's Play film series; The Lord of the Rings and Deadwood; stepson of William Campbell, captain at Royal and Ancient St. Andrew's Course in Scotland and 15-time winner of WV Amateur Golf Tournament; did not graduate
Conchata Ferrell, Two and a Half Men, Erin Brockovich
John Fiedler, movie producer
Clint McElroy, radio personality, podcaster, comic book writer
Griffin McElroy, podcaster
Justin McElroy, podcaster
Soupy Sales, national TV star of 1950s and 1960s
Michael W. Smith, three-time Grammy Award and multiple Dove Award winner
Jim Thornton, current Wheel of Fortune announcer

Journalism

Literature
Tom Bailey, fiction writer
Nelson S. Bond, fantasy and science fiction writer
Thomas M. Kromer, modernist and American writer 
Breece D'J Pancake, short fiction writer
Cynthia Rylant, author of children's books

Military
Carwood Lipton, member of Easy Company, 506th Infantry Regiment during World War II
Johnnie H. Corns, former Inspector General of the United States Army

Politics
Robert C. Byrd, U.S. Senator from West Virginia, 1959–2010
Earl Ray Tomblin, former Governor of West Virginia
Jim Justice, current Governor of West Virginia
Mark R. Maynard, current 2nd term State Senator of the 6th District of West Virginia

Science 

 Dr. Harry L. Pardue, chemist and author of Chemistry: An Experimental Science
 Dr. Charles "Carl" Hoffman, 127th president of the American Medical Association, namesake for the Dr. Charles "Carl" Hoffman Library of the History of Medical Science
 Dr. William E. Hatfield, notable inorganic chemist, author of multiple chemistry textbooks
 Lonnie Thompson, paleoclimatologist known for work with ice cores
 Dr. Ellen Mosley-Thompson, paleoclimatologist at Ohio State University 
 Leslie M. Hicks, analytical chemist

Notes

Marshall University
Marshall University
Marshall